Sudan competed at the 2019 African Games held from 19 to 31 August 2019 in Rabat, Morocco. The country competed in nine sports and did not win a medal.

Archery 

Abdelrahman Alyan, Mahmoud Elkhalifa and Mujahid Ibrahim competed in archery in the men's individual recurve and men's team recurve events.

Athletics 

Four athletes represented Sudan in athletics.

Sadam Koumi competed in the men's 400 metres event. He reached the semifinals and did not qualify to compete in the final.

Tasabih Mahdi competed in the women's 400 metres event. She was also scheduled to compete in the women's 400 metres hurdles event but she did not start.

Abdelmunaim Abdalla competed in the men's 5000 metres event. He finished in 20th place.

Ali Mohd Younes Idriss competed in the men's high jump event. He finished in 8th place.

Canoeing 

Khalid Omar, Elazza Mohamed and Badwi Mohamed represented Sudan in canoeing.

Judo 

Three athletes represented Sudan in judo.

Snooker 

Mina Samuel competed in snooker. He competed in the Men's Individual tournament.

His opponent did not start at two matches and he lost both of his other matches (against Mohamed Alakrady representing Egypt and Yassine Bellamine representing Morocco).

Taekwondo 

Five athletes represented Sudan in Taekwondo.

Volleyball 

Two doubles competed in beach volleyball:

 Muzamil Ateya and Nagi Osman (men's tournament)
 Fatma Dawoud and Ebtisam Rakhis (women's tournament)

Weightlifting 

Zikryat Khojali and Mohamed Zaid competed in weightlifting.

Khojali competed in the women's 76 kg event and Zaid competed in the men's 81 kg event.

Wrestling 

Ali Bakhet, Guma Bashir and Mustafa Ali represented Sudan in wrestling.

References 

Nations at the 2019 African Games
2019
African Games